The Drôme is a 57.9 km long river in Normandy. Its source is on the border of the Manche and Calvados departments, at le Grand Cauville locality, near Saint-Martin-des-Besaces and joins the Aure, left bank at Maisons, downstream of Bayeux in the Bessin region. It is a sub-affluent of the Vire.

Watershed 
The watershed of the Drôme neighbours those of the Vire, Aure (east), Tortonne (NW) and Seulles (SE).

It is a narrow, northward basin. The longest of its affluents is the ruisseau du Vey (7.3 km), which it joins at Cormolain.

Drôme valley 

 Castle (ranked monument historique) and Saint-Martin de Balleroy Church (ranked) at Balleroy,
 Pont de Sully (inscrit) between Castillon and Vaubadon.
 Manoir du Pont-Senot (inscrit) à Noron-la-Poterie.
 Église Notre-Dame de Ranchy (clocher inscrit).
 Château de Barbeville (inscrit).
 Castle (inscrit) and Église Saint-Cyr-et-Sainte-Julitte (inscrite) at Vaucelles.
 Église Notre-Dame-de-la-Nativité at Sully (inscrite).

References

Rivers of Normandy
Rivers of France
Rivers of Calvados (department)